Eric Antony Stromer (born April 28, 1961) was a co-host for the canceled motoring television series, Top Gear, on NBC. He was raised in Evanston, Illinois.

Career
Stromer started acting at the age of 7 doing a Kit Kat commercial. He lost out of the role of Henry Desmond to Peter Scolari in the Tom Hanks sitcom Bosom Buddies. He is the host of Over Your Head, the primary carpenter on Clean Sweep, also making appearances on Trading Spaces. He is also the co-host of Adam Carolla's home improvement podcast, Ace on the House, dispensing home improvement advice to callers.

Cancer
On February 28, 2011, Stromer related, on an episode of The Doctors, that radiography following a car accident in which he was involved uncovered a tumor on his thyroid gland. He was diagnosed with papillary cancer and had his entire thyroid removed. He is in remission.

Family
Stromer is married to Amy Tinkham. They have three children.

Filmography

References

External links
 

1961 births
American television personalities
Living people
People from Evanston, Illinois